Several colleges and universities around the world are called Saint Paul's College/University or St. Paul's College/University, including:

Africa
St Paul's College, Grahamstown, Eastern Cape
St. Paul's College, Namibia
St. Paul's University, Limuru, Kenya

Asia
St. Paul's College, Hong Kong
St. Paul's University (normally called Rikkyo University), Tokyo, Japan
St. Paul's College, Macau

India
St. Paul's College, Agra
Saint Paul's College, Goa
St. Paul's College, Kalamassery
St.Paul's College, Mumbai
St. Paul's College, in Ranchi Sadar subdivision, Jharkhand
St. Paul's College, Lucknow, a educational institution in Lucknow

Philippines
St. Paul University System, which includes:
St. Paul College of Ilocos Sur
St. Paul College of Makati
St. Paul College, Pasig

Europe
St Paul's College, Raheny, Ireland

United Kingdom
St Paul's College, Sunbury-on-Thames
St Paul's College of Education, Cheltenham, England, a former college integrated into the University of Gloucestershire

North America

Canada
St. Paul's College (Manitoba), Winnipeg
Saint Paul University, federated with the University of Ottawa
St. Paul's University College, University of Waterloo, Ontario

United States
Saint Paul College, Saint Paul, Minnesota
Saint Paul's College (Virginia)
St. Paul's College, Washington, D.C.

Oceania

Australia
St Paul's College, Adelaide
St Paul's College, Ballarat
Emmanuel College: St. Paul's Campus, Melbourne (formerly St. Paul's College)
St Paul's College, University of Sydney
St Pauls Catholic College, Sydney
St Paul's College, Kempsey
St Paul's College, Manly, New South Wales
St Paul's College, Walla Walla

New Zealand
St Paul's College, Auckland
St Paul's Collegiate School, Hamilton

See also
St. Paul's School (disambiguation)
Saint Paul (disambiguation)